Łódź Army was one of the Polish armies of the Polish Armed Forces of the Second Polish Republic that took part in the Invasion of Poland of 1939. It was officially created on 23 March 1939 with the task of filling the gap between Poznań Army in the north and Kraków Army in the south. Commanded by Juliusz Rómmel, it consisted of five infantry divisions and two cavalry brigades with support from the air force.

Tasks

The army's task was to fill the gap between Army Poznań in the north (defending Greater Poland under general Tadeusz Kutrzeba) and Army Kraków in the south (operating in Silesia and Lesser Poland under general Antoni Szylling), prevent enemy attacks in the direction of Łódź and Piotrków Trybunalski and if possible, advance towards Sieradz. It was also to cover the mobilization of a reserve Prusy Army behind the Polish lines. Because of that, the main strategic purpose of the army was to gain time and offer delaying actions and harsh resistance on the expected main German offensive line (Częstochowa-Łódź-Warsaw)in order for the mobilization to be accomplished.

Operational history
Despite several early successes, such as the Battle of Mokra on 1 September, where the Volhynian Cavalry Brigade stopped the German 4th Panzer Division, the army was forced to withdraw towards the Vistula River under increasing German pressure. The German Army Group South under Gerd von Rundstedt struck along the lines dividing the Polish Army Łódź from Army Poznań and Army Kraków. Without any natural defences, and facing a significant enemy force while lacking support, Rómmel's army was easily outmanoeuvred and cut off from the rest of the Polish forces during the remainder of the battle of the Border, with most of its units being outflanked by the German Eighth Army and the German Tenth Army. Łódź was taken by the Germans on 8 September. By the beginning of the second week of fighting, Army Łódź had suffered heavy casualties and failed to carry out its task of defending its part of the Polish borders.

General Rómmel advanced with a small contingent of forces through towards Warsaw, where he assumed command of the improvised Warsaw Army tasked with defending the Polish capital (see siege of Warsaw), but he left most of his forces behind. General Wiktor Thommée assumed command of the remaining units. Piotrków Group, or as it became known after its commander, Thommée's Group, was much more successful, managing to avoid encirclement, and after the Battle of Wola Cyrusowa (September 8) his corps' last battle was the defence of the Modlin fortress (capitulated on 29 September).

Organization
Army's commander was general Juliusz Rómmel. His chief of staff was colonel Aleksander Pragłowski. The Army also contained an Operational Group 'Piotrków' under general Wiktor Thommée.

The Army also had smaller notable units, such as two armoured trains (no.52 and no.53).

References
 Armie i samodzielne grupy operacyjne Wojska Polskiego 1939 WIEM Encyklopedia
Jan Wróblewski, Armia Łódź, Wydawnictwo Wojskowego Instytutu Historycznego, Warszawa 1975

Military units and formations of Poland in World War II
Polish armies
Military units and formations established in 1939
Military units and formations disestablished in 1939